Yashar Soltani is an Iranian journalist who is managing-director and editor-in-chief of Memari News website.

Arrest 
In September 2016, following publishing a set of declassified reports involving General Inspection Office on the controversial transfer of properties held by the Tehran Municipality to a number of people, he was arrested. He was released in November.

Politics
Soltani stood as a candidate for the City Council of Tehran in the Iranian local elections, 2017. He was placed 43rd with 256,424 votes, unable to win a seat.

References

Living people
Iranian journalists
Iranian news website owners (people)
Iranian whistleblowers
Online journalists
Iranian anti-corruption activists
Year of birth missing (living people)